Gymnopilus stabilis is a species of mushroom in the family Hymenogastraceae.

Taxonomy
Collections from the Czech Republic, Germany, and Russia plus reference vouchers of related or similar species were investigated in a molecular study. G. stabilis sequences form a moderately supported but distinct clade in a lineage sister to the G. sapineus clade, a group of species with low divergence in the ITS rDNA region.

See also

List of Gymnopilus species

External links
Gymnopilus stabilis at Index Fungorum

stabilis